Jonas H. Rivera (born May 2, 1971) is an American film producer. He produced the animated films Up (2009), Inside Out (2015), Toy Story 4 (2019) and Soul (2020), all of which won the Academy Award for Best Animated Feature. Rivera is an alumnus of San Francisco State University and has worked with Pixar Animation Studios since 1994.

Early life
Rivera was born and raised in Castro Valley, California. His father is of Mexican descent, while his mother is of English Canadian descent. As a boy, he wanted to become an animator, but according to him, he could not draw: "I was a terrible artist, and I still am." Rivera graduated from San Francisco State University with a degree in Film Production.

Career
In 1994, in the last year of making Toy Story, he joined Pixar as their first production intern: "I saw Luxo Jr. in a class and liked it so much I cold-called Pixar." Since then he worked on almost every Pixar film, at first as a coordinator and manager. In 2009, as the producer of Up, he received a nomination for the Academy Award for Best Picture. Rivera also produced Inside Out (2015) and Toy Story 4, both of which won the Academy Award for Best Animated Feature. He was the Development Producer on Soul.

During the making of the first Toy Story, he was collecting things used in the production of the movie, a collection which would eventually be known as the Pixar Archives, now counting thousands of objects and stored in a climate-controlled building. He was inspired by Disney, which also saved objects from the studio productions.

Personal life
Rivera is married to Michele. They have three children: daughters Ava and Elsa and son William.

Filmography
 Toy Story (1995) – Production office assistant
 A Bug's Life (1998) – Art department coordinator
 Toy Story 2 (1999) – Marketing and creative resources coordinator
 Monsters, Inc. (2001) – Art department manager
 Cars (2006) – Production manager, voice of "Boost"
 Up (2009) – Producer - nominated for the Academy Award for Best Picture
 Inside Out (2015) – Producer - winner of the Academy Award for Best Animated Feature
 Toy Story 4 (2019) – Producer - winner of the Academy Award for Best Animated Feature
 Soul (2020) – Development Producer

Short films
 George and A.J. (2009) – Executive Producer
 Riley's First Date? (2015) – Executive Producer

References

External links

1971 births
Living people
American animated film producers
American film producers
American people of Mexican descent
American people of English descent
American people of Canadian descent
Pixar people
Producers who won the Best Animated Feature Academy Award
People from Castro Valley, California
San Francisco State University alumni